Roland Hall Dale Jr. (October 30, 1927 – April 23, 2012) was an American football player, coach, and college athletics administrator.  He played professionally as an end in the National Football League (NFL) with the Washington Redskins for one season in 1950.  He played college football at the University of Mississippi (Ole Miss).

Dale was the ninth head football coach at Southeastern Louisiana University in Hammond, Louisiana and he held that position for two seasons, from 1972 until 1973.  His coaching record at Southeastern Louisiana was 7–14  Dale went on to become an athletic administrator, serving as athletic director at the University of Southern Mississippi from 1974 to 1986.  He died on April 23, 2012.

Head coaching record

References

External links
 
 

1927 births
2012 deaths
American football ends
Ole Miss Rebels football coaches
Ole Miss Rebels football players
Southeastern Louisiana Lions football coaches
Southern Miss Golden Eagles and Lady Eagles athletic directors
Washington Redskins players
People from Magee, Mississippi
Coaches of American football from Mississippi
Players of American football from Mississippi